Totò Diabolicus is a 1962 Italian black comedy film directed by Steno. The film consists in a parody of Italian noir comic books (such as Diabolik and Satanik) and giallo, and in it Totò plays six different characters.

Plot 
Baron Torrealta is mysteriously killed by a mysterious murderer, dressed in black, who call himself "Diabolicus". The police suspects that one of his relatives is guilty of murder because of the enormous legacy, but every time they are going to incarcerate someone,  this one gets killed by Diabolicus.

Cast 
Totò: Galeazzo di Torrealta/Carlo di Torrealta/Scipione di Torrealta/Monsignor Antonino di Torrealta/Laudomia di Torrealta/Pasquale Bonocore
Raimondo Vianello: Michele aka Lallo
Béatrice Altariba: Diana
Nadine Sanders: donna Fiore di Torrealta
Luigi Pavese: police commissioner
Mario Castellani: inspector Scalarini
Peppino De Martino: Cocozza
Steno: Angelo, the gardener
Franco Giacobini: Dr. Pandoro
Pietro De Vico: patient

References

External links
 

1962 films
Films directed by Stefano Vanzina
1960s crime comedy films
Italian black comedy films
Italian parody films
1960s black comedy films
Italian crime comedy films
Films with screenplays by Giovanni Grimaldi
1960s parody films
1962 comedy films
1962 drama films
1960s Italian-language films
1960s Italian films